Aqraba (transliteration: ʿAqrabāʾ, also spelled Akraba or Aqrabah) is a village in southern Syria, administratively part of the al-Sanamayn District of the Daraa Governorate. In the 2004 census by the Central Bureau of Statistics (CBS), Aqraba had a population of 4,413.

Geography
Aqraba is situated in the Jaydur area of the Hauran region and is immediately east of the Golan Heights. It is located 50 kilometers southwest of Damascus, 15 kilometers north of Jasim, 4 kilometers north of al-Harra and Tel al-Hara and 10 kilometers southeast of Kafr Shams. Nearby places include Naba al-Sakher to the east, Masharah to the northeast, al-Mal and al-Tiha to the north and Kafr Nasij to the northeast.

History
In the 6th century, Aqraba served as a residence of the Ghassanid Arab princes, who ruled the Arabia and Palaestina Secunda provinces on behalf of the Byzantine Empire. An inscription in the village mentions a certain "Nuʾmān", which probably refers to a Ghassanid prince of that name. The 6th-century Arabic poets al-Nabigha and Hassan ibn Thabit both mention the Ghassanid presence in Aqraba. The village contained two monasteries dating from the Ghassanid period. The village was later mentioned by the 13th-century Syrian geographer Yaqut al-Hamawi, who noted it belonged to the Jawlan district of Damascus and that "Ghassanid kings dwelt here of old".

Ottoman era
In 1596 Aqraba appeared in the Ottoman tax registers, situated in the nahiya of Jaydur, part of Hauran Sanjak. It had an entirely  Muslim population consisting  of 27 households and 13 bachelors.

References

Bibliography

External links
 Sanameine-map, 19L

Ghassanids
Populated places in Al-Sanamayn District
Villages in Syria